SKR or SKr may mean:

 Tachykinin receptor 2
 Saraiki language, ISO 639-3 code